The A4 Highway also known as the Colombo-Batticaloa highway, is the longest highway in Sri Lanka, at  in length. It connects Colombo with Batticaloa, through many important cities in Western, Sabaragamuwa, Uva and Eastern provinces.

The highway passes through Kirulapone, Nugegoda, Delkanda, Navinna, Maharagama, pannipitiya, Kottawa, Homagama, godagama, Meegoda, Meepe, Pahathgama Hanwella, Avissawella, Eheliyagoda, Kuruwita, Ratnapura, Lellopitiya, Pelmadulla, Balangoda, Beragala, Koslanda, Wellawaya, Buttala, Monaragala, Liyangolla, Siyambalanduwa, Hulanuge, Lahugala, Pottuvil, Komari, Thirukovil, Akkaraipattu, Oluvil, Karaitivu, Kalmunai, Periyakallar, Chettipalayam, Arayampathy and Kattankudy.

Meepe at A4 Road

Meepe is a town in Colombo district.

Bus Routes

99 - Colombo (Pettah) - Badulla / Passara / Welimada / Lunugala / Bibila
122 – Pettah - Avissawella / Rathnapura / Embilipitiya / Rakwana / Suriyawewa / Kataragama
124 – Maharagama – Ihala bope
182 - Padukka - Hanwella
69/122 - Maharagama - Kandy
315 - Horana - Meepe
16 - Aluthgama - Kandy
16 - Matugama - Kandy
16 - Horana - Kandy
16/122 - Maharagama - Kandy
16/15 - Matugama - Jaffna
16/15 - Matugama - Anuradhapura
16/57 - Maharagama - Anuradhapura
16/48 - Panadura - Polonnaruwa
16/48 - Maharagama - Polonnaruwa 

The stretch from Colombo up to Hanwella is known as the High Level Road.

See also
 List of A-Grade highways in Sri Lanka
129 Bus Stand Homagama

References

A04 highway
Transport in Eastern Province, Sri Lanka